Hobeysh (also Romanized as Ḩobeysh; also known as 'Salmān' is a village in Veys Rural District, Veys District, Bavi County, Khuzestan Province, Iran. At the 2006 census, its population was 47, in 7 families.

https://pincodesforindia.com/kashipurtaladeska765015/

References 

Populated places in Bavi County